At least two naval ships of Japan have been named Ashigara:

Japanese Navy ship names